Delocare is a trilobite in the order Phacopida, that existed during the lower Devonian in what is now Germany. It was described by Struve in 1958, and the type species is Delocare boopis, which was originally described under the genus Cryphaeys by Richter in 1909. The type locality was in the Eifel mountain range.

References

External links
 Delocare at the Paleobiology Database

Acastidae
Fossil taxa described in 1958
Devonian trilobites of Europe
Fossils of Germany